Jacob Nielsen (died about 1309), a great grandson of Valdemar II of Denmark, was count of Northern Halland. His father (Niels Nielsen) and grandfather (Niels Valdemarsen) had both held Halland as a county before him. Jacob received Halland in 1283, but switched allegiance to the King of Norway two years later and was declared an outlaw in 1287 after the murder of Eric V of Denmark. In Halland, he built the fortresses of Hunehals and later Varberg Fortress. Jacob's position weakened after the Norwegian king started to lose interest in the conflict with Denmark, and in 1305, he had to give up Halland to Haakon V of Norway. Haakon granted it to his own son-in-law, the Swedish duke Erik Magnusson.

Bibliography
Kr[istian] Erslev, "Jacob, Greve af Nørrehalland", Dansk biografisk leksikon, VIII. Bind. Holst - Juul, 1894, p  336 f.

13th-century births
14th-century deaths
Danish nobility
House of Estridsen
Halland
Regicides
13th-century Danish people
14th-century Danish people